Living Decorations is an extended play album by the Chicago indie rock group Maps & Atlases, released in 2011 by Barsuk Records. It was an iTunes exclusive released shortly after their debut LP Perch Patchwork. A video directed by Erin Elders, the band's lead guitarist, was released for the title track. The EP features previously unreleased remixes as well as a live track.

Track listing

References

External links
Gold Flake Paint

Maps & Atlases albums
2011 albums